Quaker Ridge Golf Club is a private golf club in Scarsdale, New York, that contains the Quaker Ridge Golf Course. Additionally, club grounds encompass numerous tennis courts, a swimming pool, a clubhouse and many other structures along the property.

History
The club was formed in 1916 by a group of businessmen who had acquired the land a year earlier from a smaller, financially strained club.  Renowned golf course designer A. W. Tillinghast was brought in to redesign the seven existing holes and construct 11 new ones.  The course was completed in 1918 and the Tudor-styled clubhouse was built in 1923.  In 1925, the purchase of additional property prompted the club to recommission Tillinghast to incorporate the new land into the existing course.  The course has remained relatively unchanged since its construction.  A few outdated bunkers were replaced in 1965.  Between 1991 and 1993 all the bunkers were restored and several tees were added.  Among its many noted features, the course has distinctly narrow fairways.

Johnny Farrell was the head professional at the Quaker Ridge from 1919–1930.  Mario Guerra is the current head professional.

Quaker Ridge has hosted a number of tournaments including two Metropolitan Amateurs, three Metropolitan Opens, two Metropolitan PGA Championships and the 1997 Walker Cup.  Quaker Ridge also hosted the Curtis Cup in 2018.

In 1969, Jimmy Demaret stated, "Quaker Ridge is the most underrated golf course in the New York area, because it has never been host course to a major championship.  I'd like to go on record as saying it would be a tough test of golf for any tournament – the U.S. Open and the PGA included."  Two-time PGA Champion Paul Runyan, who played the 1936 Metropolitan Open at Quaker, said that Quaker Ridge "is the greatest golf course in the world."

In 2008, Golf Digest rated Quaker Ridge the 30th best course in the United States. The course was also ranked 64th in the world in 2007 by Golf Magazine.

Course layout

References

External links
 Official website
 Quaker Ridge Golf Club Photos

Golf clubs and courses in New York (state)
Golf clubs and courses designed by A. W. Tillinghast
Sports venues in Westchester County, New York
Walker Cup venues
Curtis Cup venues
1916 establishments in New York (state)
Sports venues completed in 1916